The 2016 Evian Championship was played 15–18 September at the Evian Resort Golf Club in Évian-les-Bains, France. It was the 23rd Evian Championship (the first nineteen were played as the Evian Masters), and the fifth as a major championship on the LPGA Tour.

Chun In-gee won her first Evian and second major championship, four strokes ahead of runners-up Ryu So-yeon and Park Sung-hyun. Her 21-under-par score was a record for all women's majors.

The event was televised by Golf Channel and NBC Sports in the United States and Sky Sports in the United Kingdom.

Field
The field for the tournament was set at 120, and most earned exemptions based on past performance on the Ladies European Tour (LET), the LPGA Tour, or with a high ranking in the Women's World Golf Rankings.

There were 16 exemption categories for the 2016 Evian Championship.

1. The top 40 in the Women's World Golf Rankings, as of 16 August 2016
Choi Na-yeon (4), Chun In-gee (4), Carlota Ciganda, Shanshan Feng (4,7,8,9), Brooke Henderson (4,6), Charley Hull, Jang Ha-na (6), Ji Eun-hee (9), Ariya Jutanugarn (4,6), Cristie Kerr (6), Kim Hyo-joo (2,6), Kim Sei-young (6), Ko Jin-young, Lydia Ko (2,4,6,9), Jessica Korda (6), Candie Kung, Brittany Lang (4), Alison Lee (9), Minjee Lee (6), Mirim Lee, Stacy Lewis (4), Brittany Lincicome (4), Mo Martin (4), Haru Nomura (6), Anna Nordqvist (6), Lee-Anne Pace (9), Park Sung-hyun, Suzann Pettersen (2), Pornanong Phatlum, Gerina Piller, Morgan Pressel, Ryu So-yeon, Jenny Shin (6), Lexi Thompson (4,6,9), Amy Yang (9)
Ahn Sun-ju (6), Lee Bo-mee, Teresa Lu, Inbee Park (3,4,5,6,9) – thumb injury, and Jiyai Shin (4,7) did not play

2. Past Evian Championship winners
All already qualified

3. Active Evian Masters Champions (must have played in 10 LPGA Tour or LET events from 6 September 2015 to 6 September 2016)
Paula Creamer, Laura Davies, Juli Inkster, Ai Miyazato, Karrie Webb

4. Winners of the other women's majors for the last five years
Michelle Wie, Yoo Sun-young

5. Gold medal winner at the 2016 Summer Olympics
Already qualified

6. LPGA Tour winners since the 2015 Evian
Caroline Masson

7. LET winners since the 2015 Evian
Isabelle Boineau (8), Céline Herbin, Nuria Iturrioz, In-Kyung Kim, Lee Jung-min, Lin Xiyu, Nanna Koerstz Madsen (8,14), Emily Kristine Pedersen
Yeom Hye-in did not play

8. The top five on the LET Order of Merit, as of 6 September
Beth Allen, Catriona Matthew

9. Top 10 and ties from the 2015 Evian Championship
Lee Mi-hyang, Ilhee Lee

10. 2016 U.S. Women's Amateur champion
Seong Eun-jeong (a)

11. 2016 British Ladies Amateur champion
Julia Engström (a)

12. Top two players from the FireKeepers Casino Hotel Championship on the Symetra Tour
Laura Gonzalez Escallon, Ally McDonald

13. Top player after the 5 Activia Dream Tour tournaments in South Korea
Ji Joo-hyun

14. Top two from Evian qualifier
Maria Verchenova

15. Evian invitations (three)
Bronte Law (a), Hannah O'Sullivan (a), Albane Valenzuela (a)

16. LPGA Tour money list, as of 6 September (if needed to fill the field to 120)
Marina Alex, Brittany Altomare, Baek Kyu-jung, Katie Burnett, Chella Choi, Cydney Clanton, Jacqui Concolino, Lindy Duncan, Austin Ernst, Jodi Ewart Shadoff, Simin Feng, Sandra Gal, Caroline Hedwall, M. J. Hur, Vicky Hurst, Karine Icher, Tiffany Joh, Moriya Jutanugarn, Danielle Kang, Kim Kaufman, Megan Khang, Christina Kim, Joanna Klatten, P.K. Kongkraphan, Min Seo Kwak, Maude-Aimee Leblanc, Min Lee, Pernilla Lindberg, Gaby López, Lee Lopez, Sydnee Michaels, Mika Miyazato, Azahara Muñoz, Su-Hyun Oh, Ryann O'Toole, Annie Park, Park Hee-young, Jane Park, Beatriz Recari, Paula Reto, Lizette Salas, Alena Sharp, Kelly Shon, Sarah Jane Smith, Jennifer Song, Nontaya Srisawang, Angela Stanford, Kris Tamulis, Kelly Tan, Ayako Uehara, Mariajo Uribe, Cheyenne Woods, Jing Yan, Julie Yang, Sakura Yokomine

Nationalities in the field

Past champions in the field

Course

Source:

Round summaries

First round
Thursday, 15 September 2016

South Koreans Chun In-gee and Park Sung-hyun co-led after the first round at 63 (−8). Defending champion Lydia Ko was seven strokes behind at 70.

Second round
Friday, 16 September 2016

With a 66, Chun In-gee extended her lead to two strokes over Shanshan Feng and Park Sung-hyun. The cut was 145 (+3) and 72 players advanced to the weekend.

Third round
Saturday, 17 September 2016

Chun In-gee shot 65 (−6) for 194 (−19) to stretch her lead to four strokes over Park Sung-hyun.

Final round
Sunday, 18 September 2016

Chun In-gee completed her wire-to-wire victory with 69 for 263, four strokes over Park Sung-hyun and Ryu So-yeon. Her 21-under-par total was a record for both women and men. For men's majors, the record is 20 under par, held by Jason Day at the 2015 PGA Championship and Henrik Stenson at the 2016 Open Championship. The previous women's record of 19-under-par was shared by five: Dottie Pepper (1999 Nabisco Dinah Shore), Karen Stupples (2004 Women's British Open), Cristie Kerr (2010 LPGA Championship), Yani Tseng (2011 LPGA Championship, and Inbee Park (2015 KPMG Women's PGA Championship). Her 72-hole total of 263 broke the record of 267 held by Betsy King (1992 LPGA Championship) and was one stroke better than Stenson's 264 at the 2016 Open.

Source:

Scorecard
Final round

Cumulative tournament scores, relative to par

Source:

References

External links

Coverage on the Ladies European Tour's official site
Coverage on the LPGA Tour's official site

The Evian Championship
Golf tournaments in France
Evian Championship
Evian Championship
Evian Championship